Cormac mac Connmhach (died 867) was a scribe.

Cormac mac Connmhach was alive three hundred years after the foundation of Clonfert by Brendan in 553. He is described as an oeconomus, scribe, and wise man and does not seem to have been either bishop or abbot of Clonfert. Of his scriptorial work, nothing is known to survive. Nor does it seem to be known from what people he originated.

References

Annals of Ulster at CELT: Corpus of Electronic Texts at University College Cork
Annals of Tigernach at CELT: Corpus of Electronic Texts at University College Cork
Revised edition of McCarthy's synchronisms at Trinity College Dublin.
Byrne, Francis John (2001), Irish Kings and High-Kings, Dublin: Four Courts Press, 

9th-century Irish writers
People from County Galway
867 deaths
Year of birth unknown
Irish-language writers